"Of Funerals and Fish" is the pilot episode of the world's longest running sitcom, Last of the Summer Wine (1973–2010), written by Roy Clarke. It was first aired on 4 January 1973 and became the first of 295 episodes. It was aired as a Comedy Playhouse episode. The plot involved the trio going around discussing life and death.

It starred Bill Owen, Peter Sallis and Michael Bates. This also was the first appearance of Kathy Staff, although her character is at this point only known as Mrs Batty rather than Nora. Her husband, unseen in this first episode, is referred to as Harold; when the character went on to appear in the series, he would be called Wally.

References

External links
 "Of Funerals and Fish" on British Comedy Guide
  (Comedy Playhouse)
  (Last of the Summer Wine)

1973 British television episodes
Last of the Summer Wine
British television series premieres